is a 2002 short story anthology edited by Japanese author Haruki Murakami. Despite the theme's happy connotations most of the short stories have a dark, melancholic atmosphere.

Editions
Murakami selected and translated the texts, adding an original short story of his (later collected into his own Blind Willow, Sleeping Woman, 2006). For the English edition at Harvill Press (using the original English-language versions of the stories), he added an introduction and selected one more story. For the Japanese reprint, he added two stories. The main editions are thus:

 2002: Japanese-language, 11 stories.
 2004: English-language, 12 stories plus introduction.
 2006: Japanese-language, 13 stories.

Contents 
The 2004 English edition of the anthology starts with an introduction by Haruki Murakami, where he speaks about his birthday and of birthdays in general (for example he mentions his visit Jack London's farm, which he did because he liked London's writings and because they share the same birthday).

It compiles:
 ("Introduction : My birthday, your birthday", by Haruki Murakami — added to English ed. only)
 "Forever Overhead" (by David Foster Wallace)
 "Turning" (by Lynda Sexson)
 "The Birthday Cake" (by Daniel Lyons)
 "Timothy's Birthday" (by William Trevor)
 "Dundun" (by Denis Johnson)
 "The Moor" (by Russell Banks)
 "Angel of Mercy, Angel of Death" (by Ethan Canin)
 "The Birthday Present" (by Andrea Lee)
 "The Bath" (by Raymond Carver)
 "A Game of Dice" (by Paul Theroux)
 "Close to the Water's Edge" (by Claire Keegan) — (added to 2004 English hardback edition, 2006 Japanese edition and 2006 English paperback edition.)
 "The Ride" (by Lewis Robinson) — (added to 2006 Japanese edition and English paperback only)
 "Birthday Girl" (by Haruki Murakami)

References

Works by Haruki Murakami
2002 anthologies
Fiction anthologies